Ernesto Betancourt (born 5 November 1962) is a retired Cuban decathlete.

He won the gold medal at the 1986 Central American and Caribbean Games, the silver medal at the 1987 Central American and Caribbean Championships, and the silver medal at the 1990 Central American and Caribbean Games. He also became Cuban champion.

References

1962 births
Living people
Cuban decathletes
Central American and Caribbean Games gold medalists for Cuba
Central American and Caribbean Games silver medalists for Cuba
Central American and Caribbean Games medalists in athletics
Competitors at the 1986 Central American and Caribbean Games
Competitors at the 1990 Central American and Caribbean Games